Kusowo may refer to the following places:
Kusowo, Kuyavian-Pomeranian Voivodeship (north-central Poland)
Kusowo, Pomeranian Voivodeship (north Poland)
Kusowo, West Pomeranian Voivodeship (north-west Poland)